Angus is a 1995 coming-of-age comedy film directed by Patrick Read Johnson. The cast includes Charlie Talbert and James Van Der Beek in their first film roles, along with Chris Owen, Ariana Richards, George C. Scott, Kathy Bates, and Rita Moreno. Angus is based on the short story "A Brief Moment in the Life of Angus Bethune" by Chris Crutcher, from his collection Athletic Shorts: Six Short Stories.

It is mostly filmed in Owatonna, Minnesota at Owatonna Senior High School.

Plot
Angus Bethune is an overweight teenage boy living in Minnesota who, despite his talents in football and science, holds deep insecurities. Since kindergarten, he has been harassed by handsome, cruel Rick Sanford and his cohorts for not being "normal". His only friend is Troy Wedberg, another social outcast. Angus has feelings for Melissa Lefevre, a cheerleader who is dating Rick. Tired of Rick's abuse, Angus applies to a magnet school where he hopes to be free of the bullying. Rick, well aware of Angus' feelings for Melissa, rigs a school election so that Angus and Melissa will dance together in the upcoming freshman Winter Ball as King and Queen, respectively. After the stunt, the principal forbids Angus to lay a hand on Rick, or he would be expelled and lose his chance to go to the magnet school.

To prepare for the dance, Angus gets help from Troy, his mother Meg, and his narcoleptic grandfather Ivan. Angus takes dancing lessons with Madame Rulenska, but the lessons go badly. Despite Angus' request for a black tuxedo, Ivan purchases him a plum suit and tells him he can be normal and an individual at the same time. Ivan reasons that running away to another school will not solve anything and that he needs to stand up to Rick.

One day after school, Rick and his friends kidnap Troy and ask him for anything that would embarrass Angus at the Winter Ball. Troy refuses to help them, but ends up breaking his arm as he tries to get away. Meanwhile, Angus helps Ivan prepare for his wedding to his fiancée April. As Angus waits outside Ivan's room on the day of the wedding, he confides to him about how he wishes he could stand up to Rick and tell Melissa how he feels. When Angus tries to wake Ivan, he quickly discovers that Ivan has died and tells the wedding guests. Distraught, Angus opts to stay home for a few days trying to cope with Ivan's death.

Out of fear, Troy gives Rick a videotape containing footage of Angus practicing his dancing with an inflatable doll while confessing his feelings for Melissa. While visiting Angus to offer his condolences, an argument ensues between the two friends. Angus asserts he won't go to the Winter Ball because he doesn't want to be humiliated by Rick again and needs to cope with his grandfather's death.

Later that week, Angus receives a box from April containing the plum suit that he had earlier rejected. In that moment, Angus realizes Ivan was right all along: he needs to stand up for himself and face Rick, or nothing will change. He rejects an interview from the magnet school and marches to the dance in the school gymnasium wearing the plum suit. Outside the school's gymnasium, Troy warns Angus to turn around and go back to his house at once, explaining that Rick is planning a terrible prank on him. He refuses, pointing out that he tired of living in his fears and will take Ivan's advice to face up to Rick. Inside, Angus converses with Melissa for the first time. Before they can dance as King and Queen, Rick plays Troy's videotape on the monitors, prompting laughter from students. A humiliated Melissa punches Rick in the face and runs out in tears. Angus follows her, infuriated at Troy for his betrayal.

Angus apologizes to Melissa, but she does not blame him. Instead, she reveals her disgust with Rick and confesses to Angus that she is bulimic. Angus learns that Melissa likes him more than Rick because he is kind and respectful of others. Finding common ground, they go back inside and dance, with Melissa helping him out with some of the steps. When Rick scolds Melissa, Angus comes to her defense. Rick punches Angus, breaking his nose and sending him crashing through a table. Angus defiantly rises to his feet and repeatedly pushes Rick until he falls to the ground, saying no matter how many times Rick knocks him down, he will always get back up. When Angus gives Rick a choice to accept others who are different from him, Rick selfishly replies, "Whatever I am, it's something you're never gonna be," to which Angus retorts, "Thank God!" The students applaud Angus and even Rick's friends abandon him. Melissa dances with Angus again and Troy enacts revenge on Rick by breaking his nose with his cast.

Melissa asks Angus to walk her home, and they kiss. Angus rejects an offer to transfer to the magnet school, realizing that his grandfather was right and that he doesn't have to run away anymore. Angus mentions Rick was suspended for his video prank and for breaking Troy's arm. He also mentions that Rick's popularity with the other students suffered since Angus stood up to him and thus, they have no reason to fear him anymore.

Alternate cut
The script was originally more faithful to its source material, with the storyline of Angus having a gay father included among the filmed scenes. However, during a test screening in Orange County, an audience member reacted with a homophobic insult to the gay-related plot line. Based on this incident, the studio decided on editing out the character and any gay-related story lines out of the final film, to the dismay of the cast and crew.

Deleted and extended scenes are integrated into the cut-for-television version of the film to make up running time.

Cast
 Charlie Talbert as Angus Bethune
 Chris Owen as Troy Wedberg
 Kathy Bates as Meg Bethune
 George C. Scott as Grandpa Ivan Bethune
 James Van Der Beek as Rick Sanford
 Ariana Richards as Melissa Lefevre
 Rita Moreno as Madame Rulenska
 Wesley Mann as Mr. Kessler
 Robert Curtis Brown as Alexander
 Anna Thompson as April Thomas
 Kevin Connolly as Andy

Reception

Box office 
Angus was released theatrically in North America on Friday, September 15, 1995, on 1,154 screens, debuting in eighth place amidst a crowded box office. It opened against Hackers and Clockers, while To Wong Foo, Thanks for Everything! Julie Newmar, Dangerous Minds, The Usual Suspects, and Braveheart were still having a strong showing in box office numbers. To Wong Foo, Thanks for Everything! Julie Newmar ultimately won the weekend with $6,544,960 as it expanded to 1,448 screens.

In its second weekend, Sept 22–24, the film slipped to twelfth place with $1,314,839 from 1,156 screens, its widest release (a percentage drop of 31.3%). Se7en opened that weekend and won the box office with $13,949,807 from 2,441 screens.

Critical response 
Angus has a 67% "fresh" rating on review aggregator site Rotten Tomatoes, based on 18 reviews. Though some critics considered the film's underdog story familiar and formulaic, others commended Angus for its accurate portrayal of high school life compared to similar films about adolescence, since it takes a critical look at obesity, bullying, self-esteem, and high school inclusiveness, while highlighting the importance of self-acceptance.

Godfrey Cheshire of Variety wrote, "Jill Gordon’s script is emotionally ingenuous and pleasingly to-the-point, while Patrick Read Johnson’s skillful, unpretentious direction involves some fine work by cast’s appealing youngsters, especially Charlie Talbert as Angus and James Van Der Beek as Rick.” Peter Stack of the San Francisco Chronicle also reviewed the film positively, writing, "Slight and contrived as it is...[Angus] has a genuine warm spot for the outsider or socially awkward misfit -- and that covers just about everybody at one time or another.”

Janet Maslin of The New York Times opined “‘Angus' is an easygoing if predictable alternative to more gimmicky teen-age fare", adding "Mr. Scott and Ms. Bates help dignify the film without condescending to their material, and help bring home the universality of its familiar ideas about fitting in.”

Critic Emanuel Levy gave the film a "C", but conceded Angus was "played by newcomer Charles M. Talbert with a certain charm." Roger Ebert awarded the film three out of four stars and concluded "Charlie Talbert is a good casting choice for Angus, because he isn't a 'sort of' fat kid, like those models in the King Size catalog who look about 12 pounds overweight. He is fat. But he is also smart, likable, resilient and engaging. And he has the gift of deflecting his shortcomings with humor."

Home media
The film was released on VHS on August 27, 1996. It was later shown in an edited-for-TV version on Turner-owned cable television stations.

On December 17, 2009, Warner Archive released the film on DVD.

In the years since Angus’ release, the film rights have been sold by New Line Cinema and are now privately owned. Responding to a fan about whether Angus will ever be reissued as a DVD or Blu-ray with the director’s cut version, Patrick Read Johnson said it would be a matter of significant fan support, in addition to recovering the original sound and film.

Soundtrack

The soundtrack includes the Weezer song "You Gave Your Love to Me Softly", which was used in place of the track "Wanda (You're My Only Love)" which had been written specifically for the film.

Green Day contributed the song "J.A.R. (Jason Andrew Relva)", which was originally an unreleased track from the band's Dookie sessions. Billie Joe Armstrong co-produced "Back to You" by the Riverdales with producer Mass Giorgini.

The music supervisors for the film were Elliot Cahn and Jeff Saltzman, who at the time managed Green Day and The Muffs.

References

External links
 
 
 Angus at Warner Bros.

1995 films
1990s coming-of-age comedy-drama films
1990s teen comedy-drama films
Films set in Minnesota
Films shot in Minnesota
1990s English-language films
American coming-of-age comedy-drama films
American teen comedy-drama films
Films about bullying
Films directed by Patrick Read Johnson
Films produced by Charles Roven
Atlas Entertainment films
Films based on short fiction
Films produced by Dawn Steel
New Line Cinema films
1990s American films